XHEC-FM is a radio station in Sabinas, Coahuila. Broadcasting on 91.9 FM, XHEC carries a grupera format known as La Más Buena.

History
The station's concession was awarded in 1970 to Jesús Fernando Elizondo Cedillo. The concession was sold to Organización Radiofónica del Norte in 1996.

References

Spanish-language radio stations
Radio stations in Coahuila